Ruszkowo  is a village in the administrative district of Gmina Środa Wielkopolska, within Środa Wielkopolska County, Greater Poland Voivodeship, in west-central Poland.

The village has a population of 110.

History
During the German occupation of Poland (World War II), in 1940, the occupiers carried out expulsions of Poles, whose houses and farms were then handed over to German colonists as part of the Lebensraum policy. Expelled Poles were either enslaved as forced labour of new German colonists in the county or placed in a transit camp in Łódź and afterwards deported in freight trains to the General Government in the more eastern part of German-occupied Poland.

References

Ruszkowo